George Kink (born August 26, 1982) is a German former professional ice hockey player. He last played for ERC Sonthofen 1999 in the Oberliga (Germany3). He's the older brother of Marcus Kink and son of Georg Kink.

Career statistics

References

External links

1982 births
Living people
EC Peiting players
EHC München players
EV Füssen players
German ice hockey right wingers
SC Riessersee players
Sportspeople from Düsseldorf